Black in Mind is the tenth studio album by German heavy metal band Rage. Some tracks on the album such as "The Crawling Chaos" are inspired by the works of H. P. Lovecraft.

Track listing

Personnel 
Band members
Peter "Peavy" Wagner – vocals, bass, arrangements, producer
Sven Fischer – guitars
Spiros Efthimiadis – guitars
Chris Efthimiadis – drums

Additional musicians
Strings on "All this Time" conducted by Christian Wolff
Benjamin Rinnert – violin on "In a Nameless Time"

Production
Ulli Pössell – producer, engineer, mixing
Christian Wolff – studio assistant
Bernd Steinwedel – mastering

References 

1995 albums
Rage (German band) albums
GUN Records albums